St. Mary's University (in French, Université Ste-Marie, in Spanish, Universidad de Santa María) is the name of several universities:

Brazil
 Universidade Federal de Santa Maria

Canada
St. Mary's University, Calgary, Alberta
Saint Mary's University (Halifax), Nova Scotia
Collège Sainte-Marie de Montréal, Montreal, Quebec, defunct

Chile
 Universidad Técnica Federico Santa María

Panama
 Universidad Católica Santa María La Antigua

Peru
 Catholic University of Santa María

Philippines
Saint Mary's University (Philippines), Bayombong, Nueva Vizcaya

South Sudan
 St. Mary's University in Juba

United Kingdom
St Mary's University College, Belfast, a college of Queen's University Belfast, in Northern Ireland
St Mary's University, Twickenham, London, oldest Catholic university in the United Kingdom

United States
(by state)
Saint Mary's College of California, Moraga, California 
St. Mary's Seminary and University, Baltimore, Maryland
Mount St. Mary's University, Emmitsburg, Maryland
Saint Mary's College (Michigan), Orchard Lake, Michigan, defunct—now known as Madonna University
Saint Mary's University of Minnesota, Winona, Minnesota
St. Mary's University (Galveston, Texas), Galveston, Texas, a defunct university that closed in 1922.
St. Mary's University, Texas, San Antonio, Texas
University of Saint Mary, Leavenworth, Kansas

Venezuela
 Universidad Santa María (Venezuela)

See also
 St. Mary's University College (disambiguation)
 Saint Mary's (disambiguation)
 Saint Mary's College (disambiguation)
 St. Mary's High School (disambiguation)
 St. Mary's School (disambiguation)
 St. Mary's Academy (disambiguation)